The Genesis Essentia is a concept sports car that was produced by Genesis, the luxury marque of the Hyundai Motor Group. It was built in 2018 and first displayed at the New York International Auto Show in the same year. Since shortly after its unveiling, there has been speculation regarding the development of a possible production car from this concept affirmed by statements from company officials, though as of May 2020 it is unclear as to if the car is in any stage of production.

History 
Prior to the 2018 edition of the New York International Auto Show, Genesis announced that it would be presenting another concept at that year's show. By that March, the concept was indeed revealed, now with the name Essentia as a part as well. In January of the next year, Automobile Magazine announced it as their 'concept of the year' for 2018, calling it a "...truly global masterpiece"

As with the other Hyundai subsidiaries, this concept is intended for some form of production run. As early as September 2018, there were reports that Genesis executive Manfred Fitzgerald was pushing for the eventual production of the vehicle, albeit with some changes, such as conventional doors. By 2019, a possible arrival year of 2021 was proposed by further clarifications from Fitzgerald.

Design 
Like many of its contemporaries in the sports car and supercar markets, the Essentia features a number of performance and luxury features., following the brand's then-new 'athletic elegance' design language. These include a two-tone exterior, carbon fiber monocoque, a low roofline at only 50 inches, butterfly doors, digital connectivity, and others. Much of the car utilizes detailed stylized webbing as a primary texture, which designer Luc Donckerwolke noted was done by 3D printing.

See also 

Electric car
Hyundai Motor Group

References 

Essentia
Electric concept cars
2+2 coupés
Grand tourers
Rear mid-engine, rear-wheel-drive vehicles